Romano Fenati (born 15 January 1996) is an Italian motorcycle racer who has competed at Grand Prix level. He raced for the early part of the  season in Moto2, before being sacked by principal Luca Boscoscuro. In September 2022, Fenati signed with Snipers Team to race for the team in the 2023 Moto3 World Championship.

Fenati's career was marred with controversy. On 12 September 2018 he announced his retirement from motorcycle competition after being sacked two days earlier by his team Marinelli Snipers for dangerous riding. In addition to an earlier two-race ban imposed, Fenati's racing licence was later revoked for the remainder of the 2018 season. On 13 November 2018, it was announced that Fenati would return to race in the 2019 Moto3 class. He was included on the provisional 2019 Moto3 entry list released on 16 November 2018, again with the Marinelli Snipers team. 

In spite of never winning a Moto3 world championship, Fenati currently holds the most wins in the class with over 13 victories out of 28 podiums.

He was European 125 cc Champion in 2011, championship runner-up of the Italian 125GP series, and also competed in the Spanish 125GP series.

Career
Born in Ascoli Piceno, Italy, Fenati is featured in the 2016 documentary film Il Mago Mancini ("Mancini, the Motorcycle Wizard").

Moto3 World Championship

Team Italia FMI (2012)

For the 2012 Moto3 season, Fenati signed with Team Italia FMI riding an FTR Honda. At Round 1 in Qatar, he finished 2nd in his debut race. He then went on to claim his first victory at the second race of the season in Jerez, Spain. He finished at 6th position for championship.

San Carlo Team Italia (2013)
The 2013 season was disappointing for Fenati as he did not record any podium finishes, with his best position being 5th. He finished 10th in the final championship standings, with 73 points.

Sky Racing Team VR46 (2014–2016)
For the 2014 Moto3 season, Fenati signed with Valentino Rossi's Sky Racing Team by VR46. It was an up and down season for Fenati, as he scored four podiums in the first six races and ultimately recorded four wins during the season. However, inconsistent results ultimately left him in 5th position in the championship with 176 points.

The 2015 season was also an under-performance for Fenati. Though he maintained some consistency finishing in the top five in eight races, including a victory at Le Mans. Poor qualifying positions for Fenati resulted in the loss of vital points, and he finished the season with 176 points as he did in 2014 but placed one position higher in the standings.

Fenati started the 2016 season with a pole position at Qatar. However, he only managed 4th in the race. He finished in 20th in Argentina, before his first win of the season in the United States. He was seventh at Jerez, before a second-place finish at Le Mans, losing out to Brad Binder by 0.099 seconds. Fenati qualified on pole at Mugello, but failed to finish the race. He was fourth in both Catalunya and Netherlands, before a pointless 18 position in Germany. Fenati was dropped by Sky Racing VR46 in Austria as a disciplinary action for disagreeing with Uccio Salucci. On 16 August the VR46 team terminated their contract with Romano for the 2016 and 2017 seasons stating behavioural issues in conflict with team policy as the reason behind the split.

Marinelli Rivacold Snipers (2017)
In 2017, Fenati  joined Marinelli Rivacold Snipers team and had his best season to date: three wins and five second places to finish as runner-up in the Moto3 championship.

Moto2 World Championship

Marinelli Snipers Moto2 (2018)
On 9 September 2018, at the 2018 San Marino Grand Prix, Fenati was immediately disqualified after grabbing the front brake lever of rival rider Stefano Manzi, which resulted in a two-race ban. His Marinelli Snipers team then terminated their contract with Fenati following the incident. In November 2018 it was announced that he would return for the 2019 season in the Moto3 class.

Return to Moto3

VNE Snipers (2019)
He competed for this team at 2019 season.

Sterilgarda Max Racing Team (2020–2021)
Since 2017, specifically at Silverstone, which did not occupy the first position on the grid. In the Austrian GP he starts again in the first position of the grid.

Rivacold Snipers Team (from 2023)
For the 2023 season, Fenati will competed in Moto3 with Rivacold Snipers Team.

Return to Moto2

Speed Up Racing (2022)

Fenati joined Speed Up Racing to compete in Moto2 for the 2022 season. After the first few races, in May 2022, Fenati was sacked from the team because of poor results.

Controversy
Fenati has interfered with other riders a number of times. In the 2015 Argentine Grand Prix, he kicked Niklas Ajo during the warm-up and also turned Ajo's engine off during the practice start. As a consequence he was forced to start the race at the back of the field. The following year he was sacked from the VR46 team for undisclosed disciplinary reasons.

He apologized but was dropped from the Marinelli Snipers Team for the offence. His future contract to ride for Forward Racing using MV Agusta machines in 2019 was cancelled on 11 September. On 12 September, he announced his immediate retirement from motorcycle competition and criticised Manzi for escaping criticism for his part in the controversy. It was later reported that Fenati could be investigated for attempted murder: Italian consumer-rights group Codacons announced that it had reported Fenati to local prosecutors, asking authorities to investigate "any relevant criminal offences, including that of attempted murder", but authorities later determined that a charge of "private violence", similar to a road rage incident, was more appropriate.

On 21 September, in addition to a preliminary two-race ban imposed earlier, after meeting with the FIM at their headquarters in Mies, Switzerland, on 18 September, it was announced that Fenati's racing licence was revoked for the remainder of the 2018 season. He made a comeback to Moto3 for the 2019 season.

Career statistics

Grand Prix motorcycle racing

By season

By class

Races by year
(key) (Races in bold indicate pole position, races in italics indicate fastest lap)

References

External links

1996 births
Living people
Italian motorcycle racers
Moto3 World Championship riders
People from Ascoli Piceno
Moto2 World Championship riders
Motorcycle racing controversies
Sportspeople from the Province of Ascoli Piceno